Carleton is a provincial electoral district for the Legislative Assembly of New Brunswick, Canada. It is located in the west-central part of the province, and is centred on the towns of Woodstock and Hartland. It was first contested in the 2014 general election, having been created in the 2013 redistribution of electoral boundaries from portions of the former ridings of Woodstock, Carleton and a small part of York North.

The district includes the south-central parts of Carleton County.

Members of the Legislative Assembly

Election results

External links 
Website of the Legislative Assembly of New Brunswick
Map of riding as of 2018

References

New Brunswick provincial electoral districts
Woodstock, New Brunswick